William Petre may refer to:

William Petre (1505-1572), Secretary of State
William Petre, 2nd Baron Petre (1575-1637)
William Petre, 4th Baron Petre (1626-1684)
William Petre, 11th Baron Petre (1793–1850)
William Petre, 12th Baron Petre (1817–1884)
William Petre, 13th Baron Petre (1847–1893)
William Petre (diplomat), British diplomat on List of Ambassadors from the United Kingdom to the Holy See, resident at Rome 1844-1853